Trichlorofluoromethane, also called freon-11, CFC-11, or R-11,  is a chlorofluorocarbon (CFC).  It is a colorless, faintly ethereal, and sweetish-smelling liquid that boils around room temperature.  CFC-11 is a Class 1 ozone-depleting substance which damages Earth's protective stratospheric ozone layer.

Historical use 
Trichlorofluoromethane was first widely used as a refrigerant.  Because of its high boiling point (compared to most refrigerants), it can be used in systems with a low operating pressure, making the mechanical design of such systems less demanding than that of higher-pressure refrigerants R-12 or R-22.

Trichlorofluoromethane is used as a reference compound for fluorine-19 NMR studies.

The replacement, dichloromethane, boiling point , requires a higher ambient temperature to work.

Prior to the knowledge of the ozone depletion potential of chlorine in refrigerants and other possible harmful effects on the environment, trichlorofluoromethane was sometimes used as a cleaning/rinsing agent for low-pressure systems.

Production moratorium 
Trichlorofluoromethane was included in the production moratorium agreed in the Montreal Protocol of 1987.  It is assigned an  ozone depletion potential of 1.0, and U.S. production was ended on January 1, 1996.

Regulatory challenges 
In 2018, the atmospheric concentration of CFC-11 was noted by researchers to be declining more slowly than expected, and it subsequently emerged that it remains in widespread use as a blowing agent for polyurethane foam insulation in the construction industry of China.  In 2021, researchers announced that emissions declined by 20,000 U.S. tons from 2018 to 2019, which mostly reversed the previous spike in emissions. In 2022, the European Commission announced an updated regulation that mandates the recovery and prevention of emissions of CFC-11 blowing agents from foam insulation in demolition waste, which is still emitted at significant scale from building demolition waste.

Dangers
R11, like most chlorofluoroalkanes, forms phosgene gas when exposed to a naked flame.

Gallery

See also
 List of refrigerants
 IPCC list of greenhouse gases

References

External links
 CFC-11 NOAA/ESRL Global measurements
 Public health goal for trichlorofluoromethane in drinking water
 Names at webbook.nist.gov
 Data sheet at speclab.com
 
 
 Phase change data at webbook.nist.gov
 Thermochemistry data at chemnet.ru
 ChemSub Online: Trichlorofluoromethane - CFC-11
 materialsproject.org

Halomethanes
Chlorofluorocarbons
Refrigerants
Greenhouse gases